The 2004 MBNA America 400 was the 28th stock car race of the 2004 NASCAR Nextel Cup Series season, the second race of the 2004 Chase for the Nextel Cup, and the 36th iteration of the event. The race was held on Sunday, September 26, 2004, before a crowd of 140,000 in Dover, Delaware at Dover International Speedway, a 1 mile (1.6 km) permanent oval-shaped racetrack. The race took the scheduled 400 laps to complete. At race's end, Ryan Newman of Penske-Jasper Racing would dominate to win his 11th career NASCAR Nextel Cup Series win and his second and final win of the season. To fill out the podium, Mark Martin of Roush Racing and Jeff Gordon of Hendrick Motorsports would finish second and third, respectively.

Background 

Dover International Speedway is an oval race track in Dover, Delaware, United States that has held at least two NASCAR races since it opened in 1969. In addition to NASCAR, the track also hosted USAC and the NTT IndyCar Series. The track features one layout, a 1 mile (1.6 km) concrete oval, with 24° banking in the turns and 9° banking on the straights. The speedway is owned and operated by Dover Motorsports.

The track, nicknamed "The Monster Mile", was built in 1969 by Melvin Joseph of Melvin L. Joseph Construction Company, Inc., with an asphalt surface, but was replaced with concrete in 1995. Six years later in 2001, the track's capacity moved to 135,000 seats, making the track have the largest capacity of sports venue in the mid-Atlantic. In 2002, the name changed to Dover International Speedway from Dover Downs International Speedway after Dover Downs Gaming and Entertainment split, making Dover Motorsports. From 2007 to 2009, the speedway worked on an improvement project called "The Monster Makeover", which expanded facilities at the track and beautified the track. After the 2014 season, the track's capacity was reduced to 95,500 seats.

Entry list

Practice

First practice 
The first practice session would occur on Friday, September 24, at 11:05 AM EST and would last for one hour and 55 minutes.

Second practice 
The second practice session would occur on Saturday, September 25, at 9:30 AM EST and would last for 45 minutes.

Third and final practice 
The third and final practice session, sometimes referred to as Happy Hour, would occur on Saturday, September 25, at 11:10 AM EST and would last for 45 minutes.

Qualifying 
Qualifying would occur on Friday, September 24, at 2:40 PM EST. Each driver would have two laps to set a fastest time; the fastest of the two would count as their official qualifying lap. Positions 1-38 would be decided on time, while positions 39-43 would be based on provisionals. Four spots are awarded by the use of provisionals based on owner's points. The fifth is awarded to a past champion who has not otherwise qualified for the race. If no past champ needs the provisional, the next team in the owner points will be awarded a provisional.

Terry Labonte would crash on his second lap, losing the backend of his car in Turn 1. However, he had made a lap that was able to get him in on time, and would still be able to qualify without a provisional.

Seven drivers would fail to qualify: Hermie Sadler, Carl Long, Stanton Barrett, Greg Sacks, Kenny Hendrick, Derrike Cope, and Mike Garvey.

Full qualifying results

Race results

References 

2004 NASCAR Nextel Cup Series
NASCAR races at Dover Motor Speedway
September 2004 sports events in the United States
2004 in sports in Delaware